South Calcutta Girls College is an undergraduate women's college in Kolkata, India. It is affiliated to the University of Calcutta.

Courses offered 
The college offers B.A. (Hons.) in Bengali, Education, English, History, Journalism and Mass Communication, Philosophy,  Political Science, Sanskrit and Sociology. It also offers B.Sc. (Hons.) in Botany, Economics, Geography, Zoology and Psychology with B.Sc. General subjects such as Mathematics, Chemistry and Statistics.

Facilities 
The college has a central library with books for all subjects. The college also owns a canteen which supplies healthy food at a low price. The college has its own hostel facility which accommodates about 50 students every term. The college has its own Gymnasium for the students. The college also has large laboratories for students taking up Geography, Journalism, Chemistry, Botany, Zoology and Psychology. The college takes up interested students for NSS.

See also 
List of colleges affiliated to the University of Calcutta
Education in India
Education in West Bengal

References

External links
South Calcutta Girls' College

University of Calcutta affiliates
Educational institutions established in 1932
Universities and colleges in Kolkata
Women's universities and colleges in West Bengal
Arts colleges in India
1932 establishments in British India